Glyptopetalum lawsonii is a species of plant in the family Celastraceae. It is endemic to Tamil Nadu in India.

References

lawsonii
Flora of Tamil Nadu
Vulnerable plants
Taxonomy articles created by Polbot